The 2005–06 Texas Tech Red Raiders basketball team represented Texas Tech University in the 2005–06 NCAA Division I men's basketball season as a member of the Big 12 Conference. The Red Raiders were led by fifth-year coach Bob Knight. They played their home games at the United Spirit Arena in Lubbock, Texas.

Previous season
The Red Raiders finished the 2004–05 season 22–11, 10–6 in Big 12 play to finish in fourth place. In the Big 12 tournament, they defeated Iowa State and Oklahoma to advance to the championship game where they lost to Oklahoma State. They received an at-large bid to the NCAA tournament as the No. 6 seed in the West region. There they defeated UCLA and Gonzaga to advance to the Sweet Sixteen. In the Sweet Sixteen, they lost to West Virginia.

Roster

Schedule and results

|-
!colspan=12 style=|Non-conference regular season

|-
!colspan=12 style=|Big 12 regular season

|-
!colspan=9 style=|Big 12 tournament

Source

Rankings

*AP does not release post-NCAA tournament rankings.

References

Texas Tech Red Raiders basketball seasons
Texas Tech
Texas Tech
Texas Tech